China Merchants Energy Shipping Company Limited, parented by China Merchants Group, is engaged in shipping industry, including tanker transportation, bulk cargo vessel transportation. Other businesses include training for sailors and sales of electronic ship machinery. It is headquartered in Shanghai, China. They are the parent company for China VLOC Company Limited, a wholly owned subsidiary that manages four VLOCs they had previously acquire from Vale.

Its A shares were listed on the Shanghai Stock Exchange in 2006.

In September 2010, China Merchants announced that it planned to double the capacity of its dry bulk fleet by early 2012.

References

External links
China Merchants Energy Shipping Company Limited

Government-owned companies of China
Companies based in Shanghai
Logistics companies of China
Tanker shipping companies
Transport companies established in 2004
China Merchants
Shipping companies of China
Transport companies of China
2004 establishments in China